If Japan can ... Why can't we? was an American television episode broadcast by NBC News as part of the television show "NBC White Paper" on June 24, 1980, credited with beginning the Quality Revolution and introducing the methods of W. Edwards Deming to American managers that was produced by Clare Crawford-Mason and reported on by Lloyd Dobyns.

The report details how the Japanese captured the world automotive and electronics markets by following Deming's advice to practice continual improvement and think of manufacturing as a system, not as bits or pieces. Crawford-Mason went on to produce; in collaboration with Deming, a 14 hour documentary series detailing his methods through lecture excerpts, interviews, practical demonstrations, and case studies of companies that adopted his methods.

Background
During the 1980s, Japan was seen to be a manufacturing powerhouse while American industry was struggling to keep pace.  It was strongly believed that Japanese manufacturing techniques were uniquely developed for and suited to the Japanese culture, and thus unsuited for American culture.

Excerpts
Lloyd Dobyns (narrator):
We have said several times that much of what the Japanese are doing is what we taught them to do. And the man who did most of the teaching is W. Edwards Deming, statistical analyst, for whom Japan's highest industrial award for quality and productivity is named. But in his own country he is not widely recognized. That may be changing. Dr Deming is working with Nashua Corporation, one of the Fortune 500, a company with sales last year of more than $600,000,000. Deming was hired in late 1979 by Nashua’s Chief executive, William E. Conway.

Bill Conway:
And of course our major supplier of copier machines was a Japanese company. And so we saw the advantages of how many things the Japanese companies were doing. And we heard about Dr Deming. And so we got under way with our quality program with Dr Deming.

Dr Deming:
They realized that the gains that you get by statistical methods are gains that you get without new machinery, without new people. Anybody can produce quality if he lowers his production rate. That is not what I am talking about. Statistical thinking and statistical methods are to Japanese production workers, foremen, and all the way through the company, a second language. In statistical control you have a reproducible product hour after hour, day after day. And see how comforting that is to management: they now know what they can produce, they know what their costs are going to be.

Bill Conway:
Many of these programs on statistics have died in American companies because they didn't get the top management support. Now, why top management does not believe that this is the way the Japanese have improved their industry over the last 30 years I don't know.

Dr Deming:
I think that people here expect miracles. American management thinks that they can just copy from Japan—but they don't know what to copy!

Lloyd Dobyns:
But one part of Deming’s program is not likely to please them. He insists that management causes 85% of all the problems.

Dr Deming:
I ask people in management what proportion of this problem arises from your production worker. And the answer is always: All of it! That’s absolutely wrong. There’s nobody that comes out of a School of Business that knows what management is, or what its deficiencies are. There’s no one coming out of a School of Business that ever heard of the answers that I'm giving your questions—or probably even thought of the questions.

Accolades
If Japan Can... Why Can't We? won an Alfred I. duPont–Columbia University Award.

References

External links
, posted by the W. Edwards Deming Institute

NBC News
1980 in American television
Economic history of Japan